Lygus gemellatus is a species of plant-feeding insects in the family Miridae.

Distribution and habitat
This species is widespread in most of Europe and in the Oriental realm. These bugs can be found mainly along roadsides and on meadows.

Description

These bugs are usually pale grayish green, sometimes with brownish or reddish tinge. Black spot on scutellum usually are bifid apically. However, in this species color and of dark patterns on pronotum and scutellum shows high variability. Corium has black spots at the margin and cuneus has a black distal angle. Membrane is smoke gray, with yellowish-gray veins. Legs are yellowish-gray to brown. Femora have two distal black rings, while tibias show black thorns.

Biology
These plant-feeding insects have two annual generations. They overwinter as imago. Adults can be found from June to September. They are polyphagous and develop on a large scale on agricultural crops, damaging mainly  the cereal  and  leguminous  crops. They also feed on Artemisia vulgaris (juices), on Tanacetum vulgare (nectar) and on Medicago sativa.

References

 NAU  B.  (2004):  Identification  of  plantbugs  of  the  genus  Lygus in  Britain.  –  Het  News (Newsletter of the Heteroptera Recording Schemes) 3: 11–12.

External links
 Inaturalist
 Natur-in-NRW

Lygus
Insects described in 1835